Nelly Tchayem (born 4 August 1983 at Lille) is a French athlete, who specializes in the triple jump.

Biography 
She won two French National Championships titles in the triple jump: one in outdoor in 2010 and one indoors in 2003.

Prize list 
 French Championships in Athletics: 
 winner of the triple jump 2010     
 French Indoor Athletics Championships: 
 winner of the triple jump 2003

Records

Notes and references

External links 
 

1983 births
Living people
French female triple jumpers